The National Front Alliance is an alliance of political parties that contested the 2015 Egyptian parliamentary election and in the Dakahlia Governorate.

Affiliated parties
Egyptian Democratic
Nasserist Party
Future of Egypt Party
Dignity Party
Tagammu
Conference Party

References

Political party alliances in Egypt